José Juan García a.k.a. CheJuan (October 22, 1940 – December 17, 2002) was the founder of the international drug-rehabilitation institution called Hogar CREA.

Early years
García was born in Rio Piedras, Puerto Rico where he was raised by his parents. He had a tough childhood and experienced his first imprisonment when he was 15 years old. At a very young age, he became a drug addict and stole in order to pay for his habit.  He went to prison more than once because of his drug problems. However, he was fortunate enough to have met some people who would have a positive influence in his live and change it  forever, among them was the educator Ana G. Mendez. He also attributed his acceptance of "Christ" as a reason for his change.

Hogar CREA
In 1968, García founded in Puerto Rico a drug-rehabilitiation organization named Hogar CREA (plural Hogares CREA).  The acronym "CREA" stands for the 're-education of the addict'. Those who enter the program do not have to pay a fee, but must agree to the program's strict rules and engage in community service.

Doctors, psychologists and others donate their time. Expenses are covered by the volunteer board of each home. Each home has enough beds for 15 people. 28 thousand people have successfully completed the program, out of 51 thousand addicts who have been treated in 36 years. In is estimated that 92% of those who have completed the program started by García, have completely stayed out of drugs.

García's Hogares CREA have over 152 facilities worldwide, including in the United States, Dominican Republic, Costa Rica, Venezuela, Colombia, Panama, El Salvador, Honduras and Nicaragua.

Awards and recognitions
Among the awards and recognitions he received are:
 The Citizen of the Year in 1974, granted by the Puerto Rico Manufacturers Association
 Citizen of the Year 1976, by the Puerto Rico Chamber of Commerce
 An award from President Ronald Reagan and others for the exemplary community service offered by Hogar CREA in the United States.
 The Government of Puerto Rico named a plaza in Rio Piedras "Plaza José Juan 'Cheguan' García".

Later years
José Juan García died on December 22, 2002, in San Juan, Puerto Rico from cancer.  His son Javier García and his widow Flora Rosario Johnson were involved in a dispute over the control of the organization. The organizations current director is Benjamin Pintor Miranda.

See also

List of Puerto Ricans

References

External links
Puerto Rico Herald - Hogares Crea

1940 births
2002 deaths
People from Río Piedras, Puerto Rico
20th-century Puerto Rican businesspeople